Krissek Peak is a sharp peak which rises to about  on the southwest ridge from Mount Henderson, in the Britannia Range, Antarctica. It was named after geologist Lawrence A. Krissek of the Byrd Polar Research Center and Department of Geology and Mineralogy, Ohio State University, Columbus, who worked many austral summers in the central Transantarctic Mountains beginning about 1985–86.

References

Mountains of Oates Land